The 1894 Kilkenny Senior Hurling Championship was the sixth staging of the Kilkenny Senior Hurling Championship since its establishment by the Kilkenny County Board.

Confederation won the championship after a 2–05 to 1–01 defeat of Callan in the final.

References

Kilkenny Senior Hurling Championship
Kilkenny Senior Hurling Championship